Mohammad Shoaib is a politician from the Dinajpur District of Bangladesh and an elected a member of parliament from Dinajpur-5.

Career 
Shoaib was elected to parliament from Dinajpur-5 as an  independent candidate in 1988.

References 

Living people
Year of birth missing (living people)
Possibly living people
People from Dinajpur District, Bangladesh
Jatiya Party politicians
4th Jatiya Sangsad members